The 1967 South African Grand Prix, formally the 1st AA Grand Prix of South Africa (Afrikaans: Eerste AA Suid-Afrikaanse Grand Prix), was a Formula One motor race held at Kyalami on 2 January 1967. It was race 1 of 11 in both the 1967 World Championship of Drivers and the 1967 International Cup for Formula One Manufacturers. The 80-lap race was won by Cooper driver Pedro Rodríguez after he started from fourth position. John Love finished second in a privately entered Cooper and Honda driver John Surtees came in third.

Race report
This was the first use of the Kyalami circuit near Johannesburg in a World Championship Formula One race. There were some changes in the driver line-ups: John Surtees was driving for Honda, Graham Hill had switched to Lotus, his place at BRM was taken by Mike Spence and Pedro Rodríguez was on trial for Cooper.

Denny Hulme led Jack Brabham away from the start, but the Australian soon spun, handing second place to Surtees, but by lap 21 had managed to regain second. Further down the field, Rhodesian privateer racer John Love reached third place in a four-cylinder Cooper Climax. On lap 41, Brabham retired, followed by Dan Gurney on lap 44. On lap 59, Hulme had to pit for more brake fluid, handing the lead to Love. His drive was halted as with just seven laps left he had to pit to take on more fuel. Rodríguez took his first win in Formula One for Cooper from Love in second place and Surtees in third.

Classification

Qualifying

Race

Championship standings after the race

Drivers' Championship standings

Constructors' Championship standings

 Notes: Only the top five positions are included for both sets of standings.

References

South African Grand Prix
Grand Prix
South African Grand Prix
January 1967 sports events in Africa